Slippery Rock Township is a township in Lawrence County, Pennsylvania, United States. As of the 2020 census, the population was 2,913, a decline from the figure of 3,283 tabulated in 2010.

History
The township was linked to New Castle, Ellwood City and Pittsburgh in 1908 by the Pittsburgh, Harmony, Butler and New Castle Railway, an interurban trolley line. The line closed on 15 June 1931, and the trolleys were replaced by buses.

McConnell's Mill Covered Bridge was listed on the National Register of Historic Places in 1980.

Geography
Unincorporated communities in the township include Princeton, Princeton Station, Kennedy Mill, Grant City, Rose Point, McConnells Mill, and part of Energy.

Located within Slippery Rock Township is McConnells Mill State Park along the Slippery Rock Creek Gorge.

Demographics
As of the census of 2000, there were 3,179 people, 1,203 households, and 916 families residing in the township.  The population density was 105.5 people per square mile (40.7/km).  There were 1,285 housing units at an average density of 42.7/sq mi (16.5/km).  The racial makeup of the township was 99.18% White, 0.06% African American, 0.19% Native American, 0.13% Asian, 0.13% from other races, and 0.31% from two or more races. Hispanic or Latino of any race were 0.38% of the population.

There were 1,203 households, out of which 34.2% had children under the age of 18 living with them, 66.6% were married couples living together, 6.7% had a female householder with no husband present, and 23.8% were non-families. 20.5% of all households were made up of individuals, and 9.4% had someone living alone who was 65 years of age or older.  The average household size was 2.64 and the average family size was 3.06.

In the township the population was spread out, with 25.2% under the age of 18, 7.1% from 18 to 24, 27.8% from 25 to 44, 26.5% from 45 to 64, and 13.4% who were 65 years of age or older.  The median age was 39 years. For every 100 females, there were 98.7 males.  For every 100 females age 18 and over, there were 99.7 males.

The median income for a household in the township was $38,651, and the median income for a family was $43,382. Males had a median income of $35,192 versus $21,458 for females. The per capita income for the township was $16,160.  About 4.5% of families and 5.8% of the population were below the poverty line, including 5.2% of those under age 18 and 9.4% of those age 65 or over.

References

External links

Populated places established in 1813
Townships in Lawrence County, Pennsylvania
Townships in Pennsylvania